Brya is a genus of flowering plants in the legume family, Fabaceae. It belongs to the subfamily Faboideae, and was recently assigned to the informal monophyletic Pterocarpus clade of the Dalbergieae. Species include Brya ebenus, a valuable timber tree.

References

Dalbergieae
Fabaceae genera